Withdean 2000 Football Club were an English football team based in Withdean, in Brighton, who most recently played in the Combined Counties League. Originally called Westdene, they changed their name to Withdean in the late 1980s and added the "2000" after a reorganisation in that year, after which they moved from the Sussex County League to the CCL.

They won the CCL championship in 2002–03, winning 40 games, drawing four and losing only two, coming from behind to overwhelm AFC Wallingford, who had won the previous season, and AFC Wimbledon, who would win the following season. A relentless series of resounding victories in re-arranged postponed games toward the end of the season placed them beyond the reach of their rivals.

However, circumstances promptly conspired against them. Since they had given up their home ground to Brighton & Hove Albion after the latter lost the Goldstone Ground, Withdean's playing facilities were not fit to qualify them for promotion from the CCL to the Isthmian League and in the close season of 2003 their wealthy backer Alan Pook and many of the best players left for Isthmian League team Worthing. Consequently, in the 2003–04 season Withdean 2000 struggled near the bottom of the table. Unable to finance their outgoings any longer, in June 2004 they withdrew from the CCL for the following season and the club were disbanded.

References

Defunct football clubs in England
Association football clubs disestablished in 2004
2004 disestablishments in England
Defunct football clubs in East Sussex
Association football clubs established in 1983